Avhiroop Mazzumdar, born Abhiroop Dutta Mazumdar is an Indian television and film director who was associated with popular television shows like Rabb Se Hai Dua, Teri Meri Ikk Jindri, Manmohini, Fear Files, Koi Laut Ke Aaya Hai, Tashn-E-Ishq, Miley Jab Hum Tum, Sangam, Kyunki Saas Bhi Kabhi Bahu Thi, Kasturi, and many others popular Indian TV soaps. He has also directed Delhi Diary, a documentary on 100 years of New Delhi which was released by Chief Minister Sheila Dikshit. He has made several other documentaries and films, including Astitva, Sabr, Sambhav. Sabr won Best Jury and Best Non-Fiction Award at the National Film and Video Festival (Student Edition). He also received La Fémis Scholarship, Paris in 2007. Avhiroop's short film, Cognition was felicitated at BYOFF and Inscreen (Orissa).

Television shows

Web series

Short films and documentary films

References

External links
 

Indian television directors
Living people
1985 births